Jaszkowo  is a village in the administrative district of Gmina Zaniemyśl, within Środa Wielkopolska County, Greater Poland Voivodeship, in west-central Poland.

The village has a population of 250.

Here you will find Centrum Hipiki Jaszkowo, large equestrian center that the FEI was classified in 2004 as one of Europe's largest training and competition center for riders, horses and ponies as well as one of Europeby far the largest pony center. Centrum Hipiki Jaszkowo is owned and run by Antonio Chłapowski

References

Villages in Środa Wielkopolska County